The Yao people (its majority branch is also known as Mien;) is a government classification for various minorities in China and Vietnam. They are one of the 55 officially recognised ethnic minorities in China and reside in the mountainous terrain of the southwest and south. They also form one of the 54 ethnic groups officially recognised by Vietnam. In China in the last census in 2000, they numbered 2,637,421 and in Vietnam census in 2019, they numbered 891,151.

History

Early history
The origins of the Yao can be traced back 2000 years starting in Hunan. The Yao and Hmong were among the rebels during the Miao Rebellions against the Ming dynasty. As the Han Chinese expanded into South China, the Yao retreated into the highlands between Hunan and Guizhou to the north and Guangdong and Guangxi to the south, and stretching into Eastern Yunnan. Around 1890, the Guangdong government started taking action against Yao in Northwestern Guangdong.

The first Chinese exonym for "Yao people" was  the graphic pejorative yao 猺 (犭"dog radical" and yao 䍃 phonetic) "jackal", with twentieth-century reforms this was changed to yao: "precious jade".

Laotian Civil War
During the Laotian Civil War, the Yao tribes of Laos had a good relationship with U.S. forces and were dubbed to be an "efficient friendly force". They fought in favour of the (South Vietnamese) government against the communists. This relationship caused the new communist Laotian government to target Yao tribal groups for revenge once the war was over. This triggered further immigration into Thailand, where the tribes would be put into camps along the Thailand-Laos border.

Immigration to the United States
After obtaining refugee status from the Thai government and with the help of the United Nations, many Yao people were able to obtain sponsorship into the United States (although many remain in Thailand). Most of the Yao who have immigrated to the United States have settled along the Western part of the U.S., mainly in Central and Northern California such as Visalia, Oakland, Oroville, Redding, Richmond, Sacramento, but also in parts of Oregon like Portland, Salem, and Beaverton as well as the state of Washington in Seattle and Renton. See Mien American for those identified as Mien.

Culture, society, and economy

Yao society is traditionally patrilineal, with sons inheriting from their fathers.  The Yao follow patrilocal residence.

The Yao people have been farmers for over a thousand years, mostly rice cultivation through plowing, although a few practice slash-and-burn agriculture. Where the Yao live nearby forested regions, they also engage in hunting.

During the Southern Song (1127–1279), an imperial Chinese observer, Zhou Qufei, described the Yao as wearing distinctive fine blue clothing produced using indigo.

The Yao celebrate their Pan Wang (King Pan) festival annually on the sixteenth day of the tenth lunar month.  The festival celebrates the mythical original story of the Yao people, and has evolved "into a happy holiday for the Yao to celebrate a good harvest and worship their ancestors."

Religion

Daoism has historically been important to the Yao. Jinag Yingliang, in a 1948 study, argued that Yao religion was characterized by (1) a process of Han Chinese-influenced Daoisation; (2) the endurance of pre-Daoist folk religion; and (3) some Buddhist beliefs.

The description of Yao religion is similar to the definition of Chinese folk religion as described by Arthur Wolf and Steve Sangren. Scholar Zhang Youjun takes issue with claims of "strong Buddhist influence" on the Yao, arguing that "although Yao ritual texts contain Buddhist expression, the Yao do not believe in Buddhism at all. They are resolutely Taoist."

Groups and languages

There are several distinct groups within the Yao nationality, and they speak several different languages, The Iu Mien comprise 70% of the Yao population.
 Hmong–Mien languages
The Mien speak Mienic languages, including:
 Mian–Jin languages
 Iu Mien, 2,172,000 speakers (1,699,750 in China, 350,000 in Vietnam, 40,000 in Thailand, 20,250 in Laos, 60,000 in the United States, 2,000 in France) 
 Kim Mun (also known as Lanten), more than 300,000 Yao people 
 Biao Mon, 20,000 speakers 
 Dzao Min, 60,000 speakers 
 Biao Min, 43,000 speakers 
 Hmongic languages
 Bunu languages
 Pa-Hng
 Younuo
 Kiong Nai
 Lakkja language (a Tai–Kadai language)
 Chinese
 about 500,000 Yao speak Chinese dialects

In addition to China, Yao also live in northern Vietnam (where they are called Dao), northern Laos, and Myanmar. There are around 60,000 Yao in northern Thailand, where they are one of the six main hill tribes. The lowland-living Lanten of Laos, who speak Kim Mun, and the highland-living Iu Mien of Laos are two different Yao groups. There are also many Iu Mien Americans, mainly refugees from the highlands of Laos. The Iu Mien do not call themselves "Yao". Not all "Yao" are Iu Mien. A group of 61,000 people on Hainan speak the Yao language Kim Mun; 139,000 speakers of Kim Mun live in other parts of China (Yunnan and Guangxi), and 174,500 live in Laos and Vietnam.

The Bunu people call themselves Nuox , Buod nuox , Dungb nuox , or their official name Yaof zuf . Only 258,000 of the 439,000 people categorised as Bunu in the 1982 census speak Bunu; 100,000 speak the Tai–Kadai Zhuang languages, and 181,000 speak Chinese and the Tai–Kadai Bouyei language.

Mao (2004)
Mao Zongwu (2004:7-8) gives a detailed list of various Yao endonyms (i.e., self-designated names) and the Chinese names of various groups and clans associated with them. Endonyms are written in the International Phonetic Alphabet with numerical Chao tones.

Autonym  勉 or  优勉: Pangu Yao 盘古瑶, Pan Yao 盘瑶, Panhu Yao 盘瓠瑶, Trans-Mountain / Guoshan Yao 过山瑶, Large-Board / Daban Yao 大板瑶, Small-Board / Xiaoban Yao 小板瑶, Board / Ban Yao 板瑶, Top-Board / Dingban Yao 顶板瑶, Sharp-Headed / Jiantou Yao 尖头瑶, Level-Headed / Pingtou Yao 平头瑶, Red-Head / Hongtou Yao 红头瑶, Arrow-Pole / Jian'gan Yao 箭杆瑶, Cattle-Horn Yao / Niujiao 牛角瑶, Tu Yao 土瑶 (in Hezhou, Guangxi), Native / Bendi Yao 本地瑶, Flowery / Hua Yao 花瑶 (in Yangshuo County, Guangxi), Ao Yao 坳瑶, Zheng Yao 正瑶, Liang Yao 粮瑶
Autonym  金门 or  甘迪门: Blue-Indigo / Landian Yao 蓝靛瑶, Shanzi Yao 山子瑶, Flowery-Headed / Huatou Yao 花头瑶, Sand / Sha Yao 沙瑶, Level-Headed / Pingtou Yao 平头瑶, Bazi Yao 坝子瑶
Autonym  标曼 or  史门: Min Yao 民瑶, "Four Great" Min Yao 四大民瑶
Autonym  标敏 or  交公勉: East Mountain / Dongshan Yao 东山瑶 (in Quanzhou County, Guangxi), Dog-Headed / Goutou Yao 狗头瑶
Autonym  藻勉: Bapai Yao 八排瑶
Autonym  优念,  炳多优, or  珊介: Red Yao 红瑶 (in Longsheng Various Nationalities Autonomous County, Guangxi), Plains / Pingdi Yao 平地瑶
Autonym  布努: Beilou Yao 背篓瑶, Beilong Yao 背陇瑶, West Mountain / Xishan Yao 西山瑶, East Mountain Yao / Dongshan 东山瑶 (in Bama Yao Autonomous County, Guangxi), Tudi Yao 土地瑶, Tu Yao 土瑶 (in Pingguo County and Mashan County, Guangxi), Mountain / Shan Yao 山瑶, Man Yao 蛮瑶, East Valley / Dongnong Yao 东弄瑶, West Valley / Xinong Yao 西弄瑶, Fan Yao 反瑶, Anding Yao 安定瑶, White Yao 白瑶, Black Yao 黑瑶, Black-Trouser / Heiku Yao 黑裤瑶, Long-Shirt / Changshan Yao 长衫瑶
Autonym  瑙格劳 or  包诺: Siting Yao 四亭瑶, Situan Yao 四团瑶
Autonym  炯奈: Hualan Yao 花蓝瑶
Autonym  巴哼: Dog Yao 狗瑶, Eight-Surname / Baxing Yao 八姓瑶, Red Yao 红瑶 (in Liping and Congjiang Counties of Guizhou; Rongshui Miao Autonomous County and Longsheng Various Nationalities Autonomous County of Guangxi), Wood Yao 木瑶
Autonym  唔奈: Flowery Yao 花瑶 (in Longhui, Dongkou, Chenxi, and Xupu County and the Tongdao Dong Autonomous County of Hunan)
Autonym  优诺: Red Yao 红瑶
Autonym  拉珈: Tea Mountain / Chashan Yao 茶山瑶

Plains Yao
Groups considered to be "Plains Yao" (Pingdi Yao 平地瑶) include:

Autonym Bingduoyou 炳多尤 (Pingdi Yao 平地瑶, Dainaijiang 代奈江): in Jianghua Yao Autonomous County 江华 of Hunan; Gongcheng 恭城, Fuchuan 富川, Zhongshan 钟山, and Lingui 临桂 counties of Guangxi
Autonym Yeheni 爷贺尼 (Pingdi Yao 平地瑶): in Jianghua Yao Autonomous County 江华, Hunan (Jianghua County Gazetteer). The Yeheni speak a divergent Chinese dialect. It is spoken in Taoxu Town 涛圩镇 and Helukou Town 河路口镇 in Jianghua County, Hunan.
Autonym Younian 优念 (Pinghua-speaking Red Yao 平话红瑶): in Longsheng 龙胜 and Guanyang 灌阳 counties of Guangxi. According to Chen Qiguang (2013:30), the  number about 10,000 speakers in Sishui 泗水, Madi 马堤, Mengshan 孟山, Jiangliu 江柳, and other locations of Longsheng County.
Autonym Shanjie 珊介 (Shanzi Yao 山仔瑶): in Fangcheng 防城, Guangxi
Autonym Youjia 优嘉 (Yaojia 瑶家): in Guanyang County 灌阳, Guangxi
Jingdong Yao 景东县瑶族 (autonym: Lewu people 乐舞人): Jingdong County 景东彝族自治县, Yunnan. According to the Jingdong County Gazetteer (1994:519), ethnic Yao numbered 3,889 individuals in 1990, and lived mainly in Chaqing 岔箐 and Dasongshu 大松树 of Taizhong 太忠乡.

Vietnam
Tim Doling (2010:82-83) lists the following Yao (spelled Dao in the Vietnamese alphabet) subgroups in northern Vietnam.
Mienic groups
Iu Mien: Black Dao of Dien Bien and Lai Chau; Red Dao of southern Lao Cai, Yen Bai, and Son La
Kim Mien: Dao Tà Pán 大板瑶 (Dao Đại Bản, Dao Coóc Ngáng, Dao Sừng) of Ha Giang, Cao Bang, and Yen Bai; Red Dao of northern and eastern Lao Cai; Hongtou Red Dao 红头瑶 in northern Lai Chau
Kiem Mien: Red Dao of Sa Pa
Kam Mien: Coin Dao of Ha Giang, Cao Bang, Tuyen Quang, Thai Nguyen, and Bac Can
Kem Mien: Coin Dao of Hoa Binh and Son La
Quần Chẹt Mien: Hoa Binh, Son La, Tuyen Quang, Bac Can (also called the Dao Nga Hoàng, Dao Sơn Đầu)
Lô Gang Mien: Dao Lô Gang and Dao Đầu Trọc of Ha Giang, Cao Bang, Lang Son, and Mong Cai
Kim Mun groups
Kim Mun: Dao Làn Tiển 蓝靛瑶 (including the Dao Tuyển, Dao Áo Dài, and Dao Đầu Bằng)
Kim Meun: Dao Quần Trắng 白裤瑶 and Dao Thanh Y 青衣瑶

According to Doling (2010), only Kim Mun, Kim Mien, and Lô Gang may be found outside Vietnam.

Nguyen (2004:14-15, 128) lists Đại Bản, Tiểu Bản, Khố Bạch, and Làn Tiẻn as the 4 primary subdivisions of ethnic Yao in Vietnam.
Đại Bản
Dao Đỏ (Hùng Thầu Dào, Dao Coóc Ngáng, Dao Quý Lâm): located in Yen Bai, Lao Cai, Lai Chau, Tuyen Quang, Ha Giang, Cao Bang, Bac Kan, Thai Nguyen
Dao Quần Chẹt (Dao Sơn Đầu, Dao Tam Đảo, Dao Nga Hoàng): located in Hoa Binh, Ha Tay, Phu Tho, Vinh Yen, Son La, Yen Bai
Dao Thanh Phán (Dao Coóc Mùn, Dao Đội Ván, Dao Lô Gang, Dao Dụ Kiùn, Dao Thêu): located in Tuyen Quang, Bac Kan, Thai Nguyen, Lang Son, Quang Ninh, Bac Giang
Tiểu Bản
Dao Tiền (Dao Đeo Tiền): located in Hoa Binh, Phu Tho, Son La, Tuyen Quang, Cao Bang, Bac Kan
Khố Bạch
Dao Quần Trắng: located in Yen Bai, Lao Cai, Tuyen Quang, Ha Giang (known as Dao Họ in Yen Bai, Lao Cai)
Làn Tiẻn
Dao Thanh Y: located in Tuyen Quang, Bac Giang, Quang Ninh
Dao Áo Dài (Dao Tuyển, Dao Chàm, Dao Slán Chỉ): located in Yen Bai, Lao Cai, Tuyen Quang, Ha Giang, Bac Kan

Distribution
In China, Yao peoples are distributed primarily in the provinces Hunan, Guangdong, Guangxi, Guizhou, and Yunnan. Ethnic groups derived from the Yao of China are found in Vietnam, Laos, and Thailand.

Guizhou
The Yao of Guizhou are found in the following locations (Guizhou Province Gazetteer 贵州志 2002).

Libo County: townships of Yaoshan 瑶山, Yaolu 瑶麓, and Yao'ai 瑶埃
Shiqian County (2,522 people): 9 Yao villages including Leijiatun 雷家屯 and Wurongguan 乌荣关 of Beita Township 北塔乡, and Shuiwei Village of Huaqiao Township 花桥乡水尾村
Wangmo County: the 4 villages of Shangyoumai 上油迈, Xiaoyoumai 下油迈, Xinzhai 新寨, and Jiaxian 加现 in Youmai Township 油迈瑶族乡
Majiang County: 23 Yao villages in Longshan Township 龙山乡, including Heba 河坝 (with 6,474 people)
Liping County
Shunhua Township 顺化瑶族乡 (1,316 people in 1992): Gongcun 贡村, Gaoka 高卡, Yibuwan 已补晚, Yishu 已树; Gaozizhai of Gaoshu Village 高抒村高仔寨
Leidong Township 雷洞瑶族水族乡 (1,576 people in 1992): Jinchengzhai 金城寨 and Yibizhai 已毕寨 of Jincheng Village 金城村, Sanshanzhai of Xilao Village 戏劳村三山寨; Cenpangzhai 岑胖寨, Nongbozhai 弄播寨, Yunnanzhai 云南寨
Congjiang County: 2 subgroups of Red Yao 红瑶 and Pan Yao 盘瑶
Red Yao 红瑶
Cuili Township 翠里瑶族壮族乡: Gaomang 高忙, Xinzhai 新寨, Shujiawan 舒家湾, Wucai 乌菜, Jiage 架格, Baiyanchong 白岩冲, Raojia 饶家
Jiabang Township 加榜乡: Dazhou 达州村
Pan Yao 盘瑶
Xishan Township 西山镇: Cengang 岑杠, Gaojiao 高脚, Qiuka 秋卡
Douli Township 斗里乡: Dengmian 登面, Changka 长卡, Gaoliu 高柳, Beitong 碑痛
Xiutang Township 秀塘壮族乡: Dage 打格, Yusha 雨沙, Jiujia 九甲, Baidao 摆倒, Wubu 乌布, Xilin 细林
Zaibian Township 宰便镇: Zezhui 怎追
Xiajiang Township 下江镇: Huanglang 黄郎
Yongli Township 拥里乡: Dashan 大山, Laozhai 老寨, Gangbian 刚边, Huangnijing 黄泥井
Donglang Township 东郎乡: Baidui 摆堆
Rongjiang County
Tashi Township 塔石瑶族水族乡 (2,979 people): Zedong 怎东村, Zaiyong 宰勇村, Dangxiang 党相村, Tashi 塔石村, Dangdiao 党调村, Zeba 怎贝村, Qiaoyang 乔央村.
Pingjiang Township 平江乡: Jijiaoba 鸡脚坝, Balu 巴鲁
Pingyong Township 平永镇: Sanbuqiao 三步桥, Qiaohai 乔亥
Sanjiang Township 三江乡: Wuhong 乌洪
Liangwang Township 两汪乡: Cen'ao 岑熬
Pingyou Township 平尤乡: Shuangxikou 双溪口, Bakai 八开
Leishan County
Dadi Township 达地镇: Longtanggou 龙塘沟, Paisong 排松, Pingzhai 平寨, Laozhai 老寨, Beilue 背略, Pangjia 庞家, Jieli 皆力, Gaolue 高略, Tongwu 同乌, Yeliao 也辽, Xiaowu 小巫, Baimizhai 白米寨, Hebian 河边
Liuwu Township 柳乌乡: Liuwu 柳乌
Qiaosang Township 乔桑乡: Xiagaojian 下高枧
Gulu Township 固鲁乡: Nanping 南屏
Danzhai County: Pailu 排路, Yangwu 杨武, Jiapei 加配
Jianhe County: Zhandi Village, Taiyong Township 太拥乡展迪村
Sandu County: Wuxia 巫不, Pu'an 普安, Jiaxiong 甲雄, Shangjiang 上江, Niuchang 牛场
Luodian County: Ankang 安抗 of Luotuo 罗妥; Naji 纳吉, Nakao 纳考, Nanao 纳闹, Luoyang 罗羊, Longping 龙坪, Bianyang 边阳 of Fengting 风亭
Ziyun County (297 people): Tangguan Village, Maoping Township 茅坪塘贯村
Guanling County (189 people)

The Yao of Guizhou have various autonyms, such as:

 (董蒙), in Yaoshan 瑶山, Libo County. The Buyi people call them .
 (努侯), in Yaolu 瑶麓, Libo County. The Shui people call them .
 (东蒙), in Yao'ai 瑶埃, Libo County. The Buyi people call them .
 (满), in Youmai 油迈, Wangmo County.
 (容棉), in Rongjiang, Leishan, Danzhai, Jianhe, Congjiang, and Sandu Counties.

Hunan
Some subgroups of ethnic Yao in Hunan include:
Pan Yao 盘瑶 (Mian 勉): in Jianghua, Chenxian, Lanshan, Ningyuan, Daoxian, Guiyang, Lingling, Chengbu, Chenxi, Xinning; speak a Mienic language.
Guoshan Yao 过山瑶: in Jianghua, Lanshan, Ningyuan; speak a Mienic language.
Huajiao Yao 花脚瑶 (Wunai 唔奈): in Longhui, Tongdao, Xupu, Chenxi; speak a Hmongic language.
Badong Yao 八峒瑶 (Batong Yao 八垌瑶): in Xinning. The Badong Yao speak an endangered Sinitic language. It is spoken in the villages of Huangyandong 黄岩峒, Malindong 麻林峒, and Dazhendong 大圳峒 in Huangjin Ethnic Yao Township 黄金瑶族乡, Xinning County.
Pingdi Yao 平地瑶 (Bingduoyou 炳多尤): in Jianghua, Jiangyong, and speak a Chinese dialect.
Qixing Yao 七姓瑶: in Chenxi, and speak a Chinese dialect.

The Hunan Province Gazetteer (1997) gives the following autonyms for various peoples classified by the Chinese government as Yao.
 尤棉: in much of Xiangxi Prefecture
 董本尤: in Xintian County, Yizhang County, Changning County
 谷岗尤: in Lanshan County, Jianghua County
 土尤
 藻敏: in Shuangpai County, Dao County, Ningyuan County
Donglixiao 洞里销: in Xinning County; also called Bunu 布努, Donglixiao 峒里俏, or Dong Yao 峒瑶 (Xinning County Gazetteer 2009). Their language is called Donghua 峒话.
 唔奈: in Longhui County, Xupu County
 炳多尤 (also called Dainaijiang 代奈江): in Jianghua County, Jiangyong County

Tan Xiaoping (2012) also gives the following autonyms for Yao subgroups of Jiangyong County.
  勉
 优勉
 壹勉
 优尼
 炳多优

The Yao of Shaoyang Prefecture are found in the following locations (Shaoyang Prefecture Gazetteer 1997). Population statistics are from 1990.
Xinning County (12,756 Yao persons): Malin 麻林乡, Huangjin 黄金乡, Jingwei 靖位乡 (in Yuanshui 源水瑶族村)
Dongkou County (8,473 Yao persons): Naxi 𦰡溪乡 (那溪乡), Changtang 长塘乡, Dawu 大屋乡; Yuexi 月溪, Zhaping 渣坪, Tongshan 桐山
Longhui County (6,151 Yao persons): Huxingshan 虎形山乡, Mao'ao 茅坳乡, Xiaoshajiang 小沙江镇,  Qingshan 青山, Matangshan 麻塘山
Chengbu County (2,276 Yao persons): Lanrong 兰蓉, Qingyuan 清源, Dayang 大阳, Tingping 汀坪, Pengdong 蓬洞, Yangmei 杨梅
Suining County (1,641 Yao persons): Jinta 金趿, Shuikou 水口

The Shaoyang Prefecture Gazetteer (1997) reports that the Yao of Shaoyang Prefecture, Hunan speak the following languages.
Mienic languages
Longhui County 隆回: Huxingshan 虎形山, Mao'ao 茅坳, Xiaoshajiang 小沙江
Dongkou County 洞口: Dawu 大屋, Changtang 长塘
Chengbu County 城步: Qingyuan 清源, Lanrong 兰蓉
Hmongic languages?: Huangjin 黄金 and Malin 麻林 of Xinning County
Southern Dong dialect: Naxi 𦰡溪 (那溪), Dongkou County and Lianmin 联民, Suining County

The following population statistics of ethnic Yao in Hunan are from the 1990 Chinese census, as given in the Hunan Province Gazetteer (1997).

By county
County-level distribution of the Yao, 2000 Chinese Census

(Only counties or county equivalents with more than 0.1% of county population are shown.)

Written languages
After 1982, the Guangxi Nationality Institute and the Chinese Academy of Social Sciences together created a new Yao writing system which was unified with the research results of the Yao-American scholar Yuēsè Hòu (Traditional Chinese: 約瑟·候/Simplified Chinese: 约瑟·候). The writing system was finalized in 1984 in Ruyuan County( Chinese characters: 乳源瑤族自治縣）, Guangdong, which included Chinese professors Pan Chengqian (盤承乾/盘承乾), Deng Fanggui (鄧方貴/邓方贵), Liu Baoyuan (劉保元/刘保元), Su Defu (蘇德富/苏德富) and Yauz Mengh Borngh; Chinese government officials; Mien Americans Sengfo Chao (Zhao Fuming), Kao Chiem Chao (Zhao Youcai), and Chua Meng Chao; David T. Lee.

American linguist Herbert C. Purnell developed a curriculum and workshop presentations on language learning in East and Southeast Asia, as well as Yao Seng Deng from Thailand. The US delegation took the new writing system to the Iu Mien community in the United States where it was adopted with a vote of 78 to 7 by a conference of Mien American community leaders.
This writing system based on the Latin alphabet was designed to be pan-dialectal; it distinguishes 30 syllable initials, 121 syllable finals and eight tones.

For an example of how the unified alphabet is used to write Iu Mien, a common Yao language, see Iu Mien language.

There is a separate written standard for Bunu, since it is from the Hmong/Miao side, rather than the Mien/Yao side, of the Miao–Yao language family.

Some people think that a variety of Yao is, or was, written in Nüshu, an indigenous script in Southern part of Hunan Province in China. But this connection between Yao language and Nüshu is disputed, because Nüshu more likely recorded local Chinese dialect which might be also known by Yao people in Hunan.

Officially illiteracy and semi-literacy among the Yao in China still stood at 40.6% in 2002.

See also
Dance of the Yao people
Panhu

References

Sources
AsiaHarvest.org: Ethnic group profiles of China
 Forbes, Andrew, and Henley, David, 'Chiang Mai's Hill Peoples' in: Ancient Chiang Mai Volume 3. Chiang Mai, Cognoscenti Books, 2012. ASIN: B006IN1RNW
 Máo Zōngwǔ 毛宗武: Yáozú Miǎnyǔ fāngyán yánjiū 瑶族勉语方言研究 (Studies in Mien dialects of the Miao nationality; Běijīng 北京, Mínzú chūbǎnshè 民族出版社 2004), .
 Méng Cháojí 蒙朝吉: Hàn-Yáo cídiǎn - Bùnǔyǔ 汉瑶词典——布努语 (Chinese-Yao Dictionary - Bunu; Chéngdū 成都, Sìchuān mínzú chūbǎnshè 四川民族出版社 1996), .
Barker, Judith C., and Saechao, Kaochoy. "A Household Survey of Older Iu-Mien Refugees in Rural California." Journal of Cross-Cultural Gerontology 12.2 (1997): 121-143.
Barker, Judith C. & Saechao, Kaochoy. (2000). A demographic survey of Iu-Mien in West Coast States of the U.S., 1993. Journal of Immigrant Health, 2:1, 31-42.
 Phan Ngọc Khuê. 2003. Lễ cấp sắc của người Dao Lô Gang ở Lạng Sơn. Hà Nội: Nhà xuất bản văn hóa thông tin.

Films
2003 - Death of a Shaman. Directed by Richard Hall; produced by Fahm Fong Saeyang.
1989 - "Moving Mountains: The Story of the Yiu Mien". Directed and produced by Elaine Velazquez

External links

The Virtual Hilltribe Museum
The Yao ethnic minority (on a Chinese government website)
Yao religious culture - bibliography by Barend ter Haar
Yao People On-line - in Chinese
The Mien
The Yao of Thailand
LearnMien.com

 
Ethnic groups officially recognized by China
Ethnic groups in Vietnam